The 1954 Chlef earthquake struck Chlef Province in Algeria on September 9 at . The shock measured 6.7 on the moment magnitude scale and had a maximum Mercalli intensity of XI (Extreme). It destroyed Chlef, then named Orléansville, leaving over 1,243 people dead and 5,000 injured. Damage was estimated at $6 million. It was followed by multiple aftershocks. Algeria faces annual earthquakes and has undergone several changes to its earthquake building codes since its first earthquake engineering regulations from 1717.

Geology 
Powerful earthquakes strike Algeria annually, ranging in Mercalli intensity scale intensity from VI (Strong) to XI (Extreme). Chlef was hit by another major earthquake in 1980 which killed 3,500 people. The Atlas Mountains area faces aseismic deformation (change in shape not originating from movement of faults), with only marginal plate shifting each year. Both Chlef earthquakes originated from the same reverse fault zone.

There is evidence of crustal shortening along a NW-SE trend near the epicenter, but the structure of any faults is poorly understood. Because Algeria has a thin shelf and a steep coastal slope, submarine landslides are quite common, especially during earthquakes. During the 1954 earthquake, five underwater telephone cables in the Mediterranean Sea were cut by an avalanche, three recording the exact time of impact.

Damage and casualties 
Shaking extended west to Mostaganem, south to Tiaret, and east to Tizi Ouzou, and many aftershocks followed the earthquake, including a major tremor at 22:18 UTC on September 16 which further damaged Orleansville. The main shock ruptured  of rock, ripping faults and creating visible fissures in the ground along the Dahra Massif. Survivors described a sensation of rotating along an axis and that the rubble reminded them of "bombed cities in Europe." The United States Geological Survey lists the 1954 quake among the deadliest earthquakes in history. Agence France-Presse (AFP) reported that it was the worst earthquake in North African history.

Aftermath 
Orléansville was devastated by the earthquake; a fifth of it wholly destroyed, it was rebuilt and renamed El Asnam and later Chlef. While Algeria had set earthquake resistance regulations as early as 1717, it was the 1954 earthquake that ushered in fully comprehensive reforms for seismic-resistant design.

See also 
 List of earthquakes in 1954
 List of earthquakes in Algeria

References

Sources

External links 

1954 earthquakes
1954 in Algeria
1954 in science
1954
Chlef Province
1954 tsunamis
Tsunamis in Algeria
1954 disasters in Algeria